Turners Puddle is a hamlet in Dorset, England, situated on the River Piddle in the Purbeck district,  north west of Wareham. It used to be a civil parish in its own right, but now forms part of the civil parish of Affpuddle and Turnerspuddle, which also includes the settlement of Briantspuddle. In the 2011 census this joint parish had 200 households and a population of 436.

The parish includes Clouds Hill, a cottage that was the home of T. E. Lawrence and is now run by the National Trust.

References

External links

Villages in Dorset
Former civil parishes in Dorset
Purbeck District